Hard Times was a 1977 TV series based on Charles Dickens' 1854 novel of the same name, directed by John Irvin.

Cast
 Patrick Allen	 – Thomas Gradgrind
 Rosalie Crutchley – Mrs. Sparsit
 Michelle Dibnah – Sissy Jupe
 Alan Dobie – Stephen Blackpool
 Barbara Ewing – Rachael
 Edward Fox – Capt. James Harthouse
 Ursula Howells – Mrs. Gradgrind
 Harry Markham – Sleary
 Jacqueline Tong – Louisa Gradgrind
 Timothy West – Josiah Bounderby
 Richard Wren – Tom Gradgrind
 Sean Flanagan – Bitzer
 Peter Martin – Waiter

Critical reception
Screenonline wrote "The four-part adaptation by Arthur Hopcraft is streamlined but generally very faithful to the book and, as directed by John Irvin, the serial is presented with considerable panache."

References

External links
 
 Hard Times at Screenonline.

1977 British television series debuts
1977 British television series endings
1970s British drama television series
ITV television dramas
Television series by ITV Studios
Television shows produced by Granada Television
Television shows based on works by Charles Dickens
English-language television shows